Melanospermum is a genus of flowering plants belonging to the family Scrophulariaceae.

Its native range is Zimbabwe to Southern Africa.

Species
Species:

Melanospermum foliosum 
Melanospermum italae 
Melanospermum rudolfii 
Melanospermum rupestre 
Melanospermum swazicum 
Melanospermum transvaalense

References

Scrophulariaceae
Scrophulariaceae genera